Limber Omar Pérez Mauricio (born July 26, 1976 in Iriona), his first name also spelled Limbert or Limberth, is a retired Honduran football defender.

Club career
He is one of few players who have played for Honduras' Big Four: Olimpia, Marathón, Real España and F.C. Motagua.

International career
Pérez made his debut for Honduras in a July 2001 friendly match against Ecuador and has earned a total of 9 caps, scoring no goals. He has represented his country in 1 FIFA World Cup qualification match and was a member of the national squad that beat Brazil in Copa América 2001 in Colombia.

His final international was a March 2002 friendly match against the United States.

References

External links

1976 births
Living people
People from Colón Department (Honduras)
Association football defenders
Honduran footballers
Honduras international footballers
2001 Copa América players
C.D. Olimpia players
Real C.D. España players
F.C. Motagua players
Liga Nacional de Fútbol Profesional de Honduras players